This is a list of musicians and musical groups from Zimbabwe.

Musical groups 

 Barura Express – band
 Bhundu Boys – jit and chimurenga music band
 Hohodza – band
 Mbira dzeNharira – mbira band
 Mechanic Manyeruke and the Puritans – gospel music group
 R.U.N.N. family – mbira-inspired reggae and rhumba group
 Siyaya – music and dance group

Musicians 
Flint Bedrock (born 1985) – pop singer-songwriter
Mkhululi Bhebhe (born 1984) – contemporary [[gospel music gospel
Charles Charamba (born 1971) – gospel singer
Olivia Charamba (1999–1999) – gospel singer
Brian Chikwava (born 1971) – writer and musician
Simon Chimbetu (1955–2005) – singer-songwriter and guitarist
James Chimombe (1951–1990) – singer and guitarist
Musekiwa Chingodza (born 1970) – mbira and marimba player
Chirikure Chirikure (born 1962) – musician and songwriter
Stella Chiweshe (born 1946) – mbira player and singer-songwriter
Dizzy Dee (1999–1999) – Australia-based reggae artist
Leonard Dembo (1959–1996) – guitarist and singer-songwriter; member of the band Barura Express
Leonard Zhakata (born 1968) – A Rusape born songwriter, poet and social commentator
Tehn Diamond (born 1985) – Zimbabwean hip hop musician and rapper
Chartwell Dutiro (born 1957) – mbira player and singer-songwriter
Mbuya Dyoko (1944–2013) – mbira player
John Edmond (born 1936) – Rhodesian folk singer
Tendayi Gahamadze (born 1959) – mbira player and singer-songwriter; member of Mbira dzeNharira
Michael Gibbs (born 1937) – England-based jazz composer
Derek Hudson (1934–2005) – English-born conductor and composer
Ngonidzashe Kambarami (born 1983) – urban grooves artist
Victor Kunonga (born 1974) – Afrojazz singer-songwriter
Forward Kwenda (born 1963) – mbira player
Jah Prayzah (born 1987) – Afropop and Afrojazz musician
Berita (born 1991) – Afrosoul and Afropop singer
 Hope Masike mbira player and percussionist and singer
 Ignatius Mabasa (born 1971) – writer and musician
 Alick Macheso (born 1968) – singer-songwriter and guitarist
 Safirio Madzikatire (1932–1996) – actor and musician
 Takunda Mafika (1983–2011) – mbira player
 Cosmas Magaya (born 1953) – mbira player 
 Tkay Maidza (born 1996) – Australia-based singer-songwriter and rapper
 Lovemore Majaivana (born 1954) – Ndebele music singer-songwriter
 Zeke Manyika (born 1955) – England-based rock and roll singer-songwriter and drummer
 Leonard Mapfumo (born 1983) – urban grooves and hip hop artist
 Thomas Mapfumo (born 1945) – chimurenga music artist
 Chiwoniso Maraire (1976–2013) – mbira player and singer-songwriter
 Dumisani Maraire (1944–1999) – mbira player and singer-songwriter
 Mashasha (born 1982) – guitarist and singer-songwriter
 Maskiri (born 1980) – hip hop artist and rapper
 Dorothy Masuka (born 1935) – South Africa-based jazz singer
 Paul Matavire (1961–2005) – blind jit musician
 Louis Mhlanga (born 1956) – South Africa-based Afrojazz singer-songwriter and guitarist
 Obi Mhondera (born 1980) – England-based pop songwriter
 Eric Moyo (born 1982) – singer
 Tongai Moyo (1968–2011) – sungura singer-songwriter
 August Msarurgwa (1920–1968) – composer
 Audius Mtawarira (born 1977) – Australia-based urban grooves artist
 Oliver Mtukudzi (1952–2019) – Afrojazz singer-songwriter and guitarist
 Sam Mtukudzi (1988–2010) – Afrojazz musician
 Anna Mudeka – England-based musician
 Carol Mujokoro – gospel music artist
 Ephat Mujuru (1950–2001) – mbira player
 Mono Mukundu (born 1970) – music producer, composer, and multi-instrumentalist
 Prince Kudakwashe Musarurwa (born 1988) – Afrojazz musician
 Isaac Musekiwa – DR Congo-based soukous artist and saxophonist
 Busi Ncube (born 1963) – mbira player and singer
 Albert Nyathi (born 1962) – poet and singer-songwriter
 Jah Prayzah, musician
 Roki (born 1985) – Madagascar-born urban grooves artist
 Kingsley Sambo (1936–1977) – jazz guitarist
 Herbert Schwamborn (born 1973) – Germany-based hip hop and electronic music artist; member of the band Söhne Mannheims
 Jonah Sithole (1952–1997) – chimurenga music artist and guitarist
 Solomon Skuza (1956–1995) – pop singer-songwriter
 Buffalo Souljah (born 1980) – Zimdancehall and reggae artist
 Shingisai Suluma (born 1971) – gospel music artist
 Takura (born 1991) – house music and hip hop artist
 Tocky Vibes (born 1993) – Singer Lyricist Songwriter
 System Tazvida (born 1968) – singer-songwriter
 Biggie Tembo Jr. (born 1988) – jit musician
 Clem Tholet (1948–2004) – Rhodesian guitarist and folk singer
 Garikayi Tirikoti (born 1961) – mbira player
 Diego Tryno (born 1998) – urban contemporary and hip-hop musician
 Viomak – protest musician and activist
 Vusa Mkhaya (born 1974) – singer-songwriter
 Tarisai Vushe (born 1987) – Australia-based singer who appeared on Australian Idol
 Edith WeUtonga (born 1979) – Afrojazz singer-songwriter and bass guitarist
 Winky D (born 1983) – dancehall and reggae artist
 Jonathan Wutawunashe – gospel artist
 Leonard Zhakata (born 1968) – sungura and adult contemporary music artist
 Charity Zisengwe – contemporary Christian music artist
 Mudiwa Hood – (born 1985) is a Zimbabwean hip hop/gospel artist and actor.

References

 
Musicians
Zimbabwean